Native Tongue (stylized in all uppercase) is the eleventh studio album by American alternative rock band Switchfoot. It was released on January 18, 2019, through Fantasy Records. Native Tongue peaked at No. 41 in its opening week on the Billboard 200 chart and No. 2 on the Billboard Christian albums chart. At the 50th Dove Awards, Native Tongue won Rock/Contemporary Album of the Year.

Promotion

Singles 
"Native Tongue" was released on October 19, 2018, as the album's first single, and was written by Jon Foreman, Tim Foreman, and Brent Kutzle of OneRepublic. The video for the track premiered on Paste magazine's website the same day.

"Voices" was released on November 16, 2018, as the second single and the music video was released on the same day. Switchfoot promoted the album with a North American Native Tongue Tour, with supporting acts Colony House and Tyson Motsenbocker.

"All I Need" was released on December 14, 2018, across all streaming platforms, followed by "Let it Happen" on January 4, 2019.

Accolades

Track listing

History 

Native Tongue is Switchfoot's first studio album since Learning to Breathe (in 2000) not to crack the top 20 on the Billboard 200. It is also Switchfoot's first studio album since Hello Hurricane, in 2009, not to peak at No. 1 on the Billboard Top Christian Albums chart. It is Switchfoot's longest studio album by track listing, and the second-longest by duration, beaten only by Vice Verses.

Personnel

Switchfoot
Jon Foreman – lead vocals, guitar
Tim Foreman – bass guitar, background vocals, lead vocals 
Chad Butler – drums, percussion
Jerome Fontamillas – keyboards, guitar
Drew Shirley – guitar

Technical
The Foreman Brothers – producer
Brent Kutzle – producer 
Tyler Chester – producer 
Tanner Sparks – engineer, mixing 
Tyler Spry – producer, engineer 
Bear Rinehart – additional production 
Adam Hawkins – mixing 
Bryan Cook – mixing 
John Nathaniel – mixing 
Joe Laporta – mastering
Paul Blakemore – mastering 
Brandon Collins – string arrangement

Additional instrumentation
Kaela Sinclair – vocals 
Tanner Sparks – guitar 
Tyler Chester – keyboards, acoustic guitar 
Brent Kutzle – guitar, keyboards 
Tyler Spry – background vocals, programming, keyboards, guitar 
Bear Rinehart – keyboards 
Steve Wilmot – programming 
John Painter – marching drums, horns, strings 
David Davidson – violin 
David Angell – violin 
Monisa Angell – viola 
Betsy Lamb – viola 
Craig Nelson – contrabass 
Paul Nelson – cello  
Keith Tutt II – cello

Charts

References

2019 albums
Fantasy Records albums
Switchfoot albums